Cordylus rivae, the Ethiopian girdled lizard, is a species of lizard in the family Cordylidae. It is a small, spiny lizard found in Ethiopia.

References

Cordylus
Reptiles of Ethiopia
Endemic fauna of Ethiopia
Reptiles described in 1896
Taxa named by George Albert Boulenger